Alan Charles Clough  (9 November 1932 – 20 April 2020) was an Australian rules footballer who played for the Footscray Football Club in the Victorian Football League (VFL).

He played, coached and umpired in the Western Region Football League for Seddon Football Club, being inducted as a legend in both the football club and umpiring halls of fame.

Notes

External links 
		

2020 deaths
1932 births
Australian rules footballers from Victoria (Australia)
Western Bulldogs players